Edward Sydney "Sidney" Luttrell (20 June 1872 – 17 July 1932) and his brother Alfred Edward Luttrell  (1865–1924) were  partners of  S. & A. Luttrell,  a firm of architects and building contractors noted for its contributions to New Zealand architecture, both in terms  of style and technology. The practice was established in Launceston, Tasmania in 1897 when Alfred who was operating his own architectural practice, went into partnership with his younger brother and former apprentice Sidney, under the original name A. & S. Luttrell. The brothers moved to Christchurch, New Zealand and by 1902 were submitting tender notices there. Sidney Luttrell was also noted for his keen interest in horse racing. He was a part-owner of Sasanoff, winner of the Melbourne Cup in 1916.

Selected works

Christchurch
King Edward Barracks
Royal Exchange building (later known as the Regent Theatre)
New Zealand Express Company building (later known as the MLC Building and Manchester Courts)
Theatre Royal
Chapel for the Sisters of the Good Shepherd at Mount Magdala
St Mary's Convent Chapel (currently known as Rose Historic Chapel)
Warner's Hotel; 1910 addition of a fourth storey
the interior of the Odeon Theatre was remodelled by Sidney Luttrell in 1927

Elsewhere
New Zealand Express Company building, Dunedin (currently known as Consultancy House)
St Mary's Catholic Church, Hokitika

Gallery of buildings

References

19th-century Tasmanian architects
New Zealand architects
Australian racehorse owners and breeders
Business duos
Sibling duos